Anwar Al-Aug (Arabic: انور العوج; born 5 February 1986) is a Yemeni football goalkeeper who is currently playing for Al-Ittihad Ibb.

Honours

Country
Yemen U17
FIFA U-17 World Cup
Group Stage: 2003
 AFC U-17 Championship
Runner-up: 2002 AFC U-17 Championship

References

External links 
 
 

1986 births
Living people
Yemeni footballers
Yemen international footballers
Association football goalkeepers
Al-Ittihad SCC (Ibb) players
Yemeni League players